ElevenLabs is an American startup and technology company, founded by former Google engineer Piotr Dabkowski, and former Palantir strategist Mati Staniszewski. The company specializes in natural-sounding speech synthesis and text-to-speech software, using artificial intelligence and deep learning.

Products 
ElevenLabs is primarily known for its browser-based, AI-assisted text-to-speech software, which can replicate natural-sounding speech by synthesizing vocal emotion and intonation. Through its beta site, users can submit text and generate audio files from a selection of default voices. Premium users are given the ability to upload custom voice samples to create new vocal styles.

Controversy 
ElevenLabs was criticized after users were able to abuse its software to generate controversial statements, in the vocal style of celebrities, public officials, and other famous individuals. The software's ability to closely copy real voices has raised ethical concerns, with critics considering it a form of deepfaking. In response, the company said it would work on mitigating potential abuse through safeguards and identity verification.

See also 
 15.ai
 Audio deepfake

References

External links 

 Official website
Speech synthesis
Artificial intelligence laboratories
2022 establishments in New York (state)
Technology companies based in New York (state)